In the 2020–21 season, MC Oran is competing in the Ligue 1 for the 55th season, as well as the Algerian Cup. It is their 12th consecutive season in the top flight of Algerian football.

Squad list
Players and squad numbers last updated on 15 November 2020.Note: Flags indicate national team as has been defined under FIFA eligibility rules. Players may hold more than one non-FIFA nationality.

Pre-season

Competitions

Overview

{| class="wikitable" style="text-align: center"
|-
!rowspan=2|Competition
!colspan=8|Record
!rowspan=2|Started round
!rowspan=2|Final position / round
!rowspan=2|First match	
!rowspan=2|Last match
|-
!
!
!
!
!
!
!
!
|-
| Ligue 1

|  
| To be confirmed
| 27 November 2020
| In Progress
|-
| League Cup

| Preliminary round
| Quarter-finals
| 16 April 2021
| 5 June 2021
|-
! Total

Ligue 1

League table

Results summary

Results by round

Matches
On 22 October 2020, the Algerian Ligue Professionnelle 1 fixtures were announced.

Algerian League Cup

Squad information

Playing statistics

|-
! colspan=10 style=background:#dcdcdc; text-align:center| Goalkeepers

|-
! colspan=10 style=background:#dcdcdc; text-align:center| Defenders

|-
! colspan=10 style=background:#dcdcdc; text-align:center| Midfielders

|-
! colspan=10 style=background:#dcdcdc; text-align:center| Forwards

|-
! colspan=10 style=background:#dcdcdc; text-align:center| Players transferred out during the season

Goalscorers
Includes all competitive matches. The list is sorted alphabetically by surname when total goals are equal.

Transfers

In

Out

New contracts

Notes

References

2020-21
Algerian football clubs 2020–21 season